A depth gauge is an instrument for measuring depth below a reference surface. They include depth gauges for underwater diving and similar applications, and engineering instruments used to measure the depth of holes and indentations from a reference surface. 

A diving depth gauge is a pressure gauge that displays the equivalent depth below the free surface in water. The relationship between depth and pressure is linear and accurate enough for most practical purposes, and for many purposes, such as diving, it is actually the pressure that is important. It is a piece of diving equipment used by underwater divers, submarines and submersibles.

Most modern diving depth gauges have an electronic mechanism and digital display. Earlier types used a mechanical mechanism and analogue display. Digital depth gauges used by divers commonly also include a timer showing the interval of time that the diver has been submerged. Some show the diver's rate of ascent and descent, which can be is useful for avoiding barotrauma. This combination instrument is also known as a bottom timer. An electronic depth gauge is an essential component of a dive computer 

As the gauge only measures water pressure, there is an inherent inaccuracy in the depth displayed by gauges that are used in both fresh water and seawater due to the difference in the densities of fresh water and seawater due to salinity and temperature variations.

A depth gauge that measures the pressure of air bubbling out of an open ended hose to the diver is called a pneumofathometer. They are usually calibrated in metres of seawater or feet of seawater.

History 
Experiments in 1659 by Robert Boyle of the Royal Society were made using a barometer underwater, and led to Boyle's Law.  The  French physicist, mathematician and inventor Denis Papin published Recuiel de diverses Pieces touchant quelques novelles Machines in 1695, where he proposed a depth gauge for a submarine.   
A "sea-gage" for measuring ocean depth was described in Philosophia Britannica in 1747. But it wasn't until 1775 and the development of a depth gauge by the inventor, scientific instrument, and clock maker Isaac Doolittle of New Haven, Connecticut, for David Bushnell's submarine the Turtle, that one was deployed in an underwater craft.  By the early nineteenth century, "the depth gauge was a standard feature on diving bells".

Mode of operation 
With water depth, the ambient pressure increases 1 bar for every 10 m in fresh water at 4°C. Therefore, the exact depth can be determined by measuring the pressure and comparing it to the pressure at the surface. Atmospheric pressure varies with altitude and weather, and for accuracy the depth gauge should be calibrated to correct for local atmospheric pressure. This can be important for decompression safety at altitude.

Types

Boyle-Mariott depth gauge 
The Boyle-Mariotte depth gauge consists of a transparent tube open at one end. It has no moving parts, and the tube is commonly part of a circle or a flat spiral to compactly fit onto a support. While diving, water goes into the tube and compresses an air bubble inside proportionally to the depth. The edge of the bubble indicates the depth on a scale. For a depth up to 10 m, this depth gauge is quite accurate, because in this range, the pressure doubles from 1 bar to 2 bar, and so it uses half of the scale. This type of gauge is also known as a capillary gauge. At greater depths, it becomes inaccurate. The maximum depth cannot be recorded with this type of depth gauge, and accuracy is strongly affected by temperature change of the air bubble while immersed.

Bourdon tube depth gauge 

The Bourdon tube depth gauge consists of a curved tube made of elastic metal, known as a Bourdon tube. Water pressure on the tube may be on the inside or the outside depending on the design. When the pressure increases, the tube stretches, and when it decreases the tube recovers to the original curvature. This movement is transferred to a pointer by a system of gears or levers, and the pointer may have an auxiliary trailing pointer which is pushed along but does not automatically return with the main pointer, which can mark the maximum depth reached. Accuracy can be good. When carried by the diver, these gauges measure the pressure difference directly between the ambient water and the sealed internal air space of the gauge, and therefore can be influenced by temperature changes.

Membrane Depth Gauge 
In a membrane depth gauge, the water presses onto a metal canister with a flexible end, which is deflected proportionally to external pressure. Deflection of the membrane is amplified by a lever and gear mechanism and transferred to an indicator pointer like in an aneroid barometer. The pointer may push a trailing pointer which does not return by itself, and indicates the maximum. This type of gauge can be quite accurate when corrected for temperature variations. 

Strain gauges may be used to convert the pressure on a membrane to electrical resistance, which can be converted to an analog signal by a Wheatstone bridge This signal can be processed to provide a signal proportional to pressure, which may be digitised for further processing and display.

Piezoresistive pressure sensors 

Piezoresistive pressure sensors use the variation of resistivity of silicon with stress. A piezoresistive sensor consists of a silicon diaphragm on which silicon resistors are diffused during the manufacturing process. The diaphragm is bonded to a silicon wafer. The signal must be corrected for temperature variations. These pressure sensors are commonly used in dive computers.

Pneumofathometer 

A pneumofathometer is a depth gauge which indicates the depth of a surface supplied diver by measuring the pressure of air supplied to the diver. Originally there were pressure gaues mounted on the hand cranked diver's air pump used to provide breathing air to a diver wearing standard diving dress, with a free-flow air supply, in which there was not much back-pressure other than the hydrostatic pressure of depth. As non-return valves were added to the system for safety, they increased back pressure, which also increased when demand helmets were introduced, so an additional small diameter hose was added to the diver's umbilical which has no added restrictions and when a low flow rate of gas is passed through it to produce bubbles at the diver, it gives an accurate, reliable and rugged system for measuring diver depth, which is still used as the standard depth monitoring equipment for surface supplied divers. The pneumofathometer gauges are mounted on the diver's breathing gas supply panel, and are activated by a valve. The "pneumo line", as it is generally called by divers, can be used as an emergency breathing air supply, by tucking the open end into the bottom of the helmet or full face mask and opening up the valve to provide free flow air. A "gauge snubber" needle valve or orifice is fitted between the pneumo line and the gauge to reduce shock loads on the delicate mechanism, and an overpressure valve protects the gauge from pressures beyond its operating range.

Dive Computer 

Dive computers have an integrated depth gauge, with digitized output which is used in the calculation of the current decompression status of the diver. The dive depth is displayed along with other values on the  display and recorded by the computer for continuous simulation of the decompression model. Most dive computers contain a piezoresistive pressure sensor. Rarely, capacitive or inductive pressure sensors are used.

Uses
A diver uses a depth gauge with decompression tables and a watch to avoid decompression sickness. A common alternative to the depth gauge, watch and decompression tables is a dive computer, which has an integral depth gauge, and displays the current depth as a standard function.

Light based depth gauges in Biology 

A depth gauge can also be based on light: The brightness decreases with depth, but depends on the weather (e.g. whether it is sunny or cloudy) and the time of the day. Also the color depends on the water depth.

In water, light attenuates for each wavelength, differently. The UV, violet (> 420 nm), and red (< 500 nm) wavelengths disappear before blue light (470 nm), which penetrates clear water the deepest. The wavelength composition is constant for each depth and is almost independent of time of the day and the weather. To gauge depth, an animal would need two photopigments sensitive to different wavelengths to compare different ranges of the spectrum. Such pigments may be expressed in different structures.

Such different structures are found in the polychaete Torrea candida. Its eyes have a main and two accessory retinae. The accessory retinae sense UV-light (λmax = 400 nm) and the main retina senses blue-green light (λmax = 560 nm). If the light sensed from all retinae is compared, the depth can be estimated, and so for Torrea candida such a ratio-chromatic depth gauge has been proposed.

A ratio chromatic depth gauge has been found in larvae of the polychaete Platynereis dumerilii. The larvae have two structures: The rhabdomeric photoreceptor cells of the eyes and in the deep brain the ciliary photoreceptor cells. The ciliary photoreceptor cells express a ciliary opsin, which is a photopigment maximally sensitive to UV-light (λmax = 383 nm). Thus, the ciliary photoreceptor cells react on UV-light and make the larvae swimming down gravitactically. The gravitaxis here is countered by phototaxis, which makes the larvae swimming up to the light coming from the surface. Phototaxis is mediated by the rhabdomeric eyes. The eyes express at least three opsins (at least in the older larvae), and one of them is maximally sensitive to cyan light (λmax = 483 nm) so that the eyes cover a broad wavelength range with phototaxis. When phototaxis and gravitaxis have leveled out, the larvae have found their preferred depth.

See also

References

External links
 on depth gauges hosted by the Rubicon Foundation

Underwater diving safety equipment
Pressure gauges
Vertical position